Lucy Cotton (August 29, 1895 – 12 December 1948) was an American actress who appeared in 12 films between 1910 and 1921.

Biography
Cotton was born in Houston, Texas, United States and died in Miami Beach, Florida. She went to New York City in her teens and found her first role on Broadway in the chorus of The Quaker Girl. In 1915 Cotton appeared on stage in Polygamy at the Park Theatre in New York City. She then starred in the 1919 production of Up in Mabel's Room.

As a popular actress, her personal life was closely followed by the press. In 1924, she married Edward Russell Thomas, publisher of the New York Morning Telegraph. He died two years afterward, in July 1926, leaving a sizeable fortune of $27 million and a young daughter, Lucetta, behind. After that she had a series of marriages that did not last; Lytton Grey Ament (from 1927 to 1930), lawyer Charles Hann Jr. (from 1931 to divorce 1932), William M. Magraw, president of Manhattan's Underground Installations Company (from 1932 to 1941), and a Georgian-Russian Prince Vladimir Eristavi-Tchitcherine (married June 15, 1941, at a Russian Orthodox Church in New York City).

After Cotton's death, her daughter Lucetta Cotton Thomas (she changed her name to Mary Frances Thomas) decided to have her cremated in Miami, and her ashes were sent to New York City where the funeral was held.

Selected filmography 
 The Fugitive (1910)
 Life Without Soul (1915)
 The Prodigal Wife (1918)
 The Broken Melody (1919)
 The Miracle of Love (1919)
 The Sin That Was His (1920)
 The Misleading Lady (1920)
 The Devil (1921)
 The Man Who (1921)
Whispering Shadows (1921)

References

External links

 

1890s births
1948 deaths
American film actresses
American silent film actresses
20th-century American actresses